Albert Grieg Rutherford (January 3, 1879 – August 10, 1941) was a Republican member of the U.S. House of Representatives from Pennsylvania.

Albert G. Rutherford was born in Watford, Ontario, Canada.  He immigrated to the United States in 1883 with his parents, who settled in Carbondale, Pennsylvania.  He attended Blair Academy in Blairstown, NJ, and the Scranton-Lackawanna Business College. He graduated from the University of Pennsylvania Law School at Philadelphia in 1904, where he became a member of the Delta Chi fraternity.

He served as deputy prothonotary of Lackawanna County, PA, from 1907 to 1914. He moved to Honesdale, Pennsylvania, in 1918 and continued the practice of law. He enlisted in the Pennsylvania National Guard in 1904, and served as a lieutenant colonel of the Second Pennsylvania Reserve Militia in 1918.

Rutherford was elected as a Republican to the Seventy-fifth, Seventy-sixth, and Seventy-seventh Congresses and served until his death in Washington, D.C. in 1941.

See also
 List of United States Congress members who died in office (1900–49)

Sources

The Political Graveyard

1879 births
1941 deaths
Canadian emigrants to the United States
People from Lambton County
Blair Academy alumni
University of Pennsylvania Law School alumni
Republican Party members of the United States House of Representatives from Pennsylvania